FC Kolkheti Khobi is a Georgian association football club based in the town of Khobi. Following the 2022 season they won promotion to Erovnuli Liga 2, the second tier of Georgian league system.

The club has spent several seasons in the top division.

History
Established in 1936, Kolkheti played many years in Georgian championship during the Soviet Union. In 1988 the club won the title and advanced to the Soviet Second league where the next year they finished in the 5th place.
   
After 1990, when Umaglesi Liga was formed, Kolkheti participated in initial three seasons. Later they spent several years in the second and third divisions. The club returned to the top flight for 1999/2000 season only to finish at the bottom of the table.   

In 2007, the club rejoined Pirveli Liga, where they played for ten successive seasons. Another promotion attempt was made in 2015/16 when Kolkheti finished 3rd in Liga 2. They shared equal points with WIT Georgia, who won automatic promotion, while Kolkheti participated in play-offs due to disadvantage in goal difference. The club suffered a narrow defeat in a one-legged tie, although it was known beforehand that due to the club's failure to get an Umaglesi Liga license, even the victory would not have led to promotion.

Furthermore, at the end of 2016 Kolkheti lost their Liga 2 place following the relegation semi-finals against Skuri. The return leg, marred by violent conduct against a referee, was aborted, which cost the club dearly. The GFF Disciplinary Committee handed Kolkheti a 0–3 defeat and a 5,000₾ fine. 

Gia Guruli, the famous Dinamo Tbilisi striker, worked as manager of Kolkheti between December 2014 and October 2016. 

The club usually stayed in mid-table in the next seasons. In 2022, Kolkheti beat their rivals battling for a promotion qualifying place, defeated Rustavi in both play-off matches and advanced to a higher league for the first time in sixteen years.

Seasons

Current squad
As of 28 February 2023

 

 (C)

Honours
Pirveli Liga
 Silver Medal winner: 1999
 Third place: 2015-16

Name
Although the club is widely known with the current name, previously was also referred to as Olimpia Khobi and FC Khobi.

The very name stems from Colchis, an ancient state situated at the eastern Black Sea coast.

References

External links
 On Soccerway

 Facebook page

Kolkheti Khobi
Association football clubs established in 1936